Life in Space is the follow up solo album by Nik Turner to Space Fusion Odyssey. The album was released on Cleopatra Records in September, 2017.

Track listing
The album includes:- 

1. End Of The World

2. Why Are You?

3. Back To Earth

4. Secrets Of The Galaxy

5. Universal Mind

6. Approaching The Unknown

7. As You Were

8. Master Of The Universe

References 

2017 albums
Nik Turner albums